4U: Outside is an extended play by South Korean boy group BtoB released on August 30, 2021, through Cube Entertainment, marketed as a special release. The album is the group's second release without members Sungjae and Hyunsik, who were completing their mandatory military service at the time of the release. The EP consists of six tracks, including the pre-released single "Show and Prove" and the lead single "Outsider". The physical version is available in two versions: "Silent" and "Awake".

Background
On August 12, Cube officially announced their comeback with the released artwork teaser image of the special album 4U: Outside through their official social network service. The teaser contains the album name and release date. This is the first time in about 9 months since the mini-album Inside released in November 2020.

Artwork and packaging
BtoB released two album versions for the EP: Silent and Awake version. The EP has a book cover, book package, booklet, lyric paper, CD, invitation card, postcard, photo card, film photo card and poster which is only available for pre-order.

Promotion
On August 16, 2021, Cube released a time table for BtoB's special album through their official homepage and SNS, which shows the group's promotion schedule beginning August 17 until the release of their album on August 31. It included track list, concept photos, audio snippet, and a teaser of the upcoming music video for the title track "Outsider". The EP will be released digitally on August 30, and physically the following day.

To commemorate the release of the album, the global entertainment platform Makestar, Dearmymuse, kTown4U, and Apple Music, opened the one-on-one video call event page.

Track listing

Charts

Release history

References

External links

2021 EPs
BtoB (band) EPs
Cube Entertainment EPs
Kakao M EPs
Korean-language EPs